Willi Schröder (28 December 1928 – 20 October 1999) was a German footballer who played as a forward.

Club career 
Schröder was a member of the 1961 Werder Bremen DFB-Pokal winning squad. It was Werder Bremen's first DFB-Pokal win, and earned them a spot as a charter member of the newly reformed Bundesliga.

Schröder played 54 games and scored 20 goals as a midfielder for Werder Bremen in the then Oberliga Nord for three seasons from 1960 to 1963. He also played 14 games with three goals as a striker in the Regionalliga Nord for TuS Bremerhaven 93 in 1963–64.

International career 
Schröder also had 12 career caps in international play for the West Germany national team, with three goals. He was part of the West German squad at the 1952 Summer Olympics.

References

External links
 
 
 Willi Schröder's profile at Sports Reference.com

1928 births
1999 deaths
Footballers from Berlin
Association football forwards
German footballers
Germany international footballers
Germany B international footballers
SV Werder Bremen players
Olympic footballers of Germany
Footballers at the 1952 Summer Olympics